Le Robert 2nd Canton Nord is a former canton in the Arrondissement of La Trinité on Martinique. It had 14,774 inhabitants (2012). It was disbanded in 2015. The canton comprised part of the commune of Le Robert.

References

Cantons of Martinique